S. tonkinensis  may refer to:
 Scaphis tonkinensis, an air-breathing sea slug species
 Sindora tonkinensis, a legume species found in Cambodia and Vietnam
 Sinogastromyzon tonkinensis, a ray-finned fish species
 Sophora tonkinensis, a plant species

See also
 Tonkinensis